Artem Shut (born 18 June 1995) is a Belarusian former professional footballer.

References

External links

Profile at pressball.by

1995 births
Living people
Belarusian footballers
Association football defenders
FC Slavia Mozyr players